James Gilbert Haydon (4 May 1901 – 21 September 1969) was a professional footballer who played as a full back in the Football League for Bristol Rovers for ten years from 1921 until 1931.

Although he played youth and non-League football for other teams, Bristol Rovers were his only League side. He joined them in only their second season in the Football League, and their first in the newly created Division Three (South). He went on to play 311 league and cup games for Rovers before leaving them in 1931 and scored five goals.

At the time he left Rovers he had made the second highest number of appearances for the club by any player, behind only goalkeeper Jesse Whatley.

Sources

1901 births
1969 deaths
Footballers from Bristol
English footballers
Association football defenders
Bristol Rovers F.C. players
Kingswood A.F.C. players
English Football League players